Nicholas Stuart Gray (23 October 1922, Scotland – 17 March 1981) was a British actor and playwright, perhaps best known for his work in children's theatre in England.  He was also an author of children's fantasy; he wrote a number of novels, a dozen plays, and many short stories. Neil Gaiman has written that Gray "is one of those authors I loved as a boy who holds up even better on rereading as an adult". Many other modern fantasy authors, such as Cecilia Dart-Thornton, Kate Forsyth, Cassandra Golds, Sophie Masson, and Garth Nix, cite Gray's work as something they enjoyed as children.

Perhaps his best-known books are The Seventh Swan and Grimbold's Other World. Gray often produced adaptations or continuations of traditional fairy tales and fantasy works, as in his Further Adventures of Puss in Boots. His The Stone Cage is a re-telling of Rapunzel from a cat's point of view. Over the Hills to Fabylon is about a city whose king has the ability to make it fly off across the mountains if he feels it is in danger.

Gray maintained a long-term collaborative relationship with set designer and illustrator Joan Jefferson Farjeon, who supplied the costume and scenic designs for many of the theatrical productions of his plays, as well as the illustrations for most of his printed plays and for the novel version of The Seventh Swan.

Bibliography

Plays for children
 Beauty and the Beast (1951)
 The Princess and the Swineherd (1952)
 The Tinder Box (1954)
 The Hunters and the Henwife (1954)
 The Marvellous Story of Puss in Boots (1955)
 New Clothes for the Emperor (1957)
 The Imperial Nightingale (1957)
 The Other Cinderella (1958)
 The Seventh Swan: A Play (1962)
 The Stone Cage: A Play (1963)
 New Lamps for Old (1968)
 Gawain and the Green Knight (1969)

Novels for children
 Over the Hills to Fabylon (1954)
 Down in the Cellar (1961)
 The Seventh Swan: A Novel (1962)
 Grimbold's Other World (1963)
 The Stone Cage: A Novel (1963)
 The Apple Stone (1965)
 The Further Adventures of Puss in Boots (1971)
 The Wardens of the Weir (1978)
 The Garland of Filigree (1979)

Short stories for children
 Mainly in Moonlight (1965) — collection of twelve short stories
 The Edge of Evening (1976) — collection of eight short stories
 A Wind from Nowhere (1978) — collection of nine short stories
 The Sorcerer's Apprentices (1986) — picture book of a story from Mainly in Moonlight with new illustrations

Novel for adults
 Killer's Cookbook (1976)

Poetry
 Facets: Poems and Pictures (1977)

Non-fiction
 The Boys: Cats with Everything (1968)

References

External links
 
 

Scottish fantasy writers
Scottish children's writers
Scottish dramatists and playwrights
1922 births
1981 deaths
20th-century British dramatists and playwrights